This article is a list of the largest spherical buildings in the world. In order to qualify for inclusion, the spherical construction for each entry must be the building itself (not spherical extension on the exterior of the building).

Spherical building
Spherical building
Spherical building

References